Aizen may refer to:

 Aizen Myō-ō (愛染明王), a popular deity in Japanese Buddhism.
 Sōsuke Aizen (藍染 惣右介), a central antagonist of the manga series Bleach.

See also
 
 
 Eizen